Ihud Bnei HaBrit is an Israeli political party that participated in the April 2019 Israeli legislative election. It is mostly an Arab Christian party, with some Jewish and Muslim support.

For the September 2019 Israeli legislative election, the party changed its name to Hatnuah Hanotzrit Haliberalit. For the 2021 Israeli legislative election, the party changed its name to "ברית השותפות לאיחוד לאומי".

History
Bnei Brit HaHadasha ("Sons of the New Testament"), soon changed to Bnei Brit ("Allies"), was established in 2013 with the aim of representing the interests of Arab Christians in Israel. The party encourages full integration of Arab Christians into Israeli society, the two-state solution, and enlistment of Arab speaking Christians into the Israel Defense Forces. It was founded by Bishara Shilyan, a sea captain from Nazareth, and one of the founders of the Christian Enlistment Forum and a central promoter of recruitment of Christians into the Israeli Defense Forces. Israel's Arab Christians are predominantly Melkite Greek and Roman Catholic and represent a minority within the broader Arab population of the country.

He said the purpose of the statue would be to prevent Nazareth's Christian heritage from being eroded. The town's Christian population has been steadily decreasing relative to its Muslim population, with Christian residents leaving to the predominately Jewish cities of Nazareth Illit, Shfar'am, and Haifa.

The list was officially submitted in the April 2019 Israeli legislative election as Ihud Bnei HaBrit ("United Allies"). The party aims to promote equality between majority and minorities in Israel, in the spirit of the Israeli Declaration of Independence. In its TV broadcast, Shilyan promised to make Israel into a maritime powerhouse in a joined Christian–Jewish effort.

The party participated in the September 2019 Israeli legislative election under the new name Christian Liberal Movement, with the same leader.

See also 
 List of political parties in Israel
Christianity in Israel
Politics of Israel

References

External links 
Official Facebook Page

2013 establishments in Israel
Christian political parties
Christianity in Israel
Political parties established in 2013
Arab political parties in Israel
Zionist political parties in Israel